"Strawberry Cake" is a song written and originally recorded by Johnny Cash for his 1976 live album Strawberry Cake.

Released in a live version as  single from the album, the song reached number 54 on U.S. Billboard country chart for the week of March 13, 1976. The B-side contained a live version of "I Got Stripes" from the same album.

Content 
It is a story song.

Critical response 
In the opinion of Greg Laurie, the author of the book Johnny Cash: The Redemption of an American Icon, "Cash's late 1970s output—'The Last Gunfighter Ballad', 'Look at Them Beans', 'Strawberry Cake', and 'The Rambler'—was stale and out of touch."

Track listing

Charts

References

External links 
 "Strawberry Cake" on the Johnny Cash official website

Johnny Cash songs
1976 songs
1976 singles
Songs written by Johnny Cash
Columbia Records singles
Live singles